Stomphastis horrens is a moth of the family Gracillariidae. It is known from Ethiopia.

References

Endemic fauna of Ethiopia
Stomphastis
Insects of Ethiopia
Moths of Africa